Andrei Nikolaevich Gladkov (born 24 March 1997), is a Russian Paralympic swimmer. Gladkov has won three gold medals at the 2015 World Championships and one gold medal at the 2020 Summer Paralympics.

Paralympics
Gladkov represented Russia at the 2012 Summer Paralympics and won a silver medal and two bronze medals. He represented Russian Paralympic Committee athletes at the 2020 Summer Paralympics and won a gold medal in the men's 4 × 100 metre medley relay 34pts event.

Personal life
Gladkov is married to Daria, and has a son Mark.

References

Living people
1997 births
Paralympic swimmers of Russia
Medalists at the 2020 Summer Paralympics
Swimmers at the 2020 Summer Paralympics
Medalists at the 2012 Summer Paralympics
Swimmers at the 2012 Summer Paralympics
Paralympic medalists in swimming
Paralympic gold medalists for the Russian Paralympic Committee athletes
Paralympic silver medalists for Russia
Paralympic bronze medalists for Russia
Russian male freestyle swimmers
Russian male backstroke swimmers
S7-classified Paralympic swimmers
Sportspeople from Volgograd
21st-century Russian people